The 1928 Boston University Pioneers football team was an American football team that represented Boston University as an independent during the 1928 college football season. In its third season under head coaches Reggie Brown and Edward N. Robinson, the team compiled a 3–3–2 record and was outscored by a total of 95 to 58.

Schedule

References

Boston University
Boston University Terriers football seasons
Boston University football